Citizens' Military Training Camps (CMTC) were military training programs of the United States. Held annually each summer during the years 1921 to 1940, the CMTC camps differed from National Guard and Organized Reserve training in that the program allowed male citizens to obtain basic military training without an obligation to call-up for active duty. The CMTC were authorized by the National Defense Act of 1920 as a compromise that rejected universal military training.
In its nearly two decades of operation, the CMTC trained some 400,000 men in at least one season from 1921 to 1940. Overall the program was disappointing, as only 5,000 officer commissions were awarded to men who completed the required four summers of training. 

Before the United States entered World War I, private citizens of the Preparedness Movement set up what were known as Plattsburg Movement camps to build a reserve of qualified men. These provided at least one summer of training in 1915 and 1916 to some 40,000 men, who were all college graduates and largely drawn from elite social classes.

Plattsburgh camps
As tensions increased and war broke out in Europe, some Americans concerned about United States participation organized the Preparedness Movement, made up of a group of influential Americans who supported the Allies of World War I. Before the U.S. entered into World War I, private citizens organized what were known as the "Plattsburgh camps", a volunteer pre-enlistment training program. The camps were set up and funded privately. The group recognized that the standing U.S. Army was far too small to help the Allies and would have to expand immensely if the U.S. went to war. The Movement established the camps to train additional potential Army officers during the summers of 1915 and 1916. 

The largest and best known camp was near Plattsburgh, New York under the command of Captain Halstead Dorey. Trainees included Grenville Clark, Willard Straight, Robert Bacon, Mayor John Purroy Mitchel, and Bishop James De Wolf Perry.

Some 40,000 men (all college graduates) attended the Plattsburgh camp and other sites. They became physically fit, learned to march and shoot, and provided the cadre of a wartime officer corps. Enlistees were required to pay their own expenses. Suggestions by labor unions that talented working-class youth be invited to Plattsburgh were ignored.

These camps were formalized under the Military Training Camps Association, which in 1917 launched a monthly magazine, National Service. (In 1922, the magazine was acquired by and folded into The American Army and Navy Journal, and Gazette of the Regular, National Guard and Reserve Forces.)

CMTC

CMTC camps were a month in length and held at about 50 Army posts nationally. At their peak in 1928 and 1929, about 40,000 men received training annually. But the camps were considered disappointing in achieving stated goals, especially in the commissioning of Organized Reserve officers. The program established that participants could receive a Reserve commission as a second lieutenant by completing four successive summer courses (titled Basic, Red, White, and Blue). Only 5,000 such commissions were awarded over the 20-year history of the CMTC. No records appear to have survived that document total participation, but it is estimated that 400,000 men had at least one summer of training.

Among known participants were Harry S. Truman, Ronald Reagan, Robert Penn Warren, Walter S. McIlhenny, Chuck Yeager, John J. McCloy and William Guarnere.

Camp Edwin F. Glenn, located at Fort Benjamin Harrison, Indianapolis, Indiana, was listed on the National Register of Historic Places in 1995.

See also
 Presidency of Woodrow Wilson
 American entry into World War I
 Preparedness Movement

References

Bibliography

 Other editions are available.

External links

The Plattsburg Movement and its Legacy, Relevance, Autumn 1997.
Lost Battalions: The Great War and the Crisis of American Nationality, by Richard Slotkin, New York: Holt, 2005
Between the Wars: Citizens' Military Training Camp (CMTC), Fort George G. Meade Museum

Military education and training in the United States
United States home front during World War I
1921 establishments in the United States
1940 disestablishments in the United States